Marlon Chenjeria Brutus (born 10 October 1980) is a Sint Maartener cricketer.

A right-handed batsman and left-arm fast-medium bowler, Brutus was selected in Sint Maarten's squad for the 2006 Stanford 20/20, playing in their preliminary round loss to the United States Virgin Islands (USVI). In the USVI innings he bowled two overs which conceded 12 runs, but he did take the wicket of Terrance Webbe with the fourth ball of the tournament. Batting at number eight, Brutus was dismissed without scoring by John Florent. This marks his only appearance in Twenty20 cricket. As of October 2014, Brutus was playing minor inter-island matches for Sint Maarten.

See also
List of Sint Maarten Twenty20 players

References

External links
Marlon Brutus at ESPNcricinfo
Marlon Brutus at CricketArchive

Living people
1980 births
Sint Maarten cricketers
Sint Maarten representative cricketers